is a private university in Ukyo-ku, Kyoto, Kyoto, Japan. The school first opened as a junior college in 1971 and became a four-year college in 2001.

External links
 Official website

Educational institutions established in 1971
Private universities and colleges in Japan
Universities and colleges in Kyoto Prefecture